Rhodes Park School is a private school for boys and girls in Lusaka, Zambia.

References

Educational institutions established in 1965
Schools in Lusaka
Private schools in Zambia
Cambridge schools in Zambia
1965 establishments in Zambia